Corymbia stockeri, commonly known as the blotchy bloodwood, is a species of small tree that is endemic to Cape York Peninsula in Queensland. It has rough, tessellated bark on the trunk and branches, lance-shaped adult leaves, flower buds in groups of seven, creamy white flowers and barrel-shaped to urn-shaped fruit.

Description
It has thick, soft, scaly to flaky, reddish bark on the trunk and branches. Flowering has been observed in February and the flowers are creamy white.

Taxonomy and naming
The blotchy bloodwood was first formally described in 1987 by Denis John Carr and Stella Grace Maisie Carr who gave it the name Eucalyptus stockeri and published the description in their book Eucalyptus II - The rubber cuticle, and other studies of the Corymbosae. The type specimens were collected by Geoffrey Stocker near Mutchilba in 1973. In 1995, Ken Hill and Lawrie Johnson changed the name to Corymbia stockeri, publishing the change in the journal Telopea. The specific epithet (stockeri) honours the collector of the type specimens.

In 2002, Anthony Bean described two subspecies in the journal Austrobaileya and the names have been accepted by the Australian Plant Census:
 Corymbia stockeri subsp. peninsularis (K.D.Hill & L.A.S.Johnson) A.R.Bean (previously known as Corymbia hylandii subsp. peninsularis) is a smaller tree with non-scurfy buds and later dull adult leaves than those of the autonym;
 Corymbia stockeri (D.J.Carr & S.G.M.Carr) K.D.Hill & L.A.S.Johnson subsp. stockeri.

Distribution and habitat
Subspecies stockeri grows in woodland on stony ridges with little soil and is only known from the Stannary Hills west of Atherton. Subspecies peninsularis is more widespread than the autonym and grows in forest and woodland on river levees and gently-sloping hills, and is found from some of the Torres Strait Islands south to the Palmer River on Cape York.

Conservation status
This eucalypt is classified as of "least concern" under the Queensland Government Nature Conservation Act 1992.

See also
List of Corymbia species

References

stockeri
Myrtales of Australia
Flora of Queensland
Plants described in 1987
Taxa named by Maisie Carr